In mathematics, more specifically in topological groups, an extension of topological groups, or a topological extension, is a  short exact sequence   where  and  are topological groups and   and    are  continuous homomorphisms which are also open onto their images. Every extension of topological groups is therefore  a group extension.

Classification of extensions of topological groups
We say that the topological extensions  
 
and  

are equivalent (or congruent) if there exists a topological isomorphism  making commutative the diagram of Figure 1.

We say that the topological extension

is a split extension (or splits) if it is equivalent to the trivial extension

It is easy to prove that the topological extension   splits if and only if there is a continuous homomorphism  such that  is the identity map on 

Note that the topological extension  splits if and only if the subgroup  is a topological direct summand of

Examples

 Take  the real numbers and  the integer numbers. Take    the natural inclusion and  the natural projection. Then

 

 is an extension of topological abelian groups. Indeed it is an example of a non-splitting extension.

Extensions of locally compact abelian groups (LCA)

Let be an extension of locally compact abelian groups
 
Then the sequence
 
 is an extension of locally compact abelian groups.

References

Topological groups
Topology